Suleiman (Solomon) Alexandrovich Yudakov ( – 1990) was a Soviet Bukharian composer of Bukharan Jewish descent.

Biography

Suleiman Yudakov, a Bukharian Jew, was born in Kokand, and started to devote himself to music in the orphanage where he spent three years of his childhood. His first teacher there was Mikhail Naigof.  In 1932, he was accepted to the so-called rabfak (рабочий факультет, or workers' faculty - an educational establishment set up to prepare workers and peasants for higher education) of the Moscow Conservatory majoring as a flautist. In 1939, Suleiman Yudakov became a student in the class of Reinhold Glière at the conservatory's Department of Composing. In 1941, he had to interrupt his studies due to the outbreak of the war and leave for Tashkent. From 1943 to 1946 he worked as artistic director at the Tajik State Philharmonic in Dushanbe, but then returned to Tashkent.

Compositions

In 1944, Suleiman Yudakov composed the melody of the Tajik SSR's regional anthem. This melody has since been used in "Surudi Milli", the national anthem of Tajikistan.

After the war, Suleiman Yudakov composed many works, including the first Uzbek comical opera, ballets, cantatas, and symphonic music:

 1945 – "", a drama ("The Son" in Russian)
 "Восточная поэма" (Vostochnaya poema/Eastern Poem), for violin and piano
 "Fantasia for violin, violoncello and piano"
 "Dancing suite" for two pianos, in three parts.

Honours

 Stalin Prize, 1951
 State Prize of the Uzbek SSR, 1970
 Order of the Red Banner of Labour
 Order of the Badge of Honour
 People's Artist of the Uzbek SSR, 1976.

References

1916 births
1990 deaths
People from Kokand
People from Fergana Oblast
Bukharan Jews
Uzbekistani Jews
Tajikistani composers
Tajikistani Jews
Soviet Jews
National anthem writers
20th-century Tajikistani musicians 
Stalin Prize winners
Uzbekistani composers
Soviet composers